The Phasianinae (Horsfield, 1821) are a subfamily of the pheasant family (Phasianidae) of landfowl, the order Galliformes.  The subfamily includes true pheasants, tragopans, grouse, turkey and similar birds. Although this subfamily was considered monophyletic and separated from the partridges, francolins, and Old World quails (Perdicinae) till the early 1990s, molecular phylogenies have shown that this placement is paraphyletic. For example, some partridges (genus Perdix) are more closely affiliated to pheasants, whereas Old World quails and partridges from the genus Alectoris are closer to junglefowls. There are two clades in the Phasianinae: the erectile clade and the non-erectile clades. Both clades are believed to have diverged during the early Oligocene, about 30 million years ago.

The Phasianinae are characterised by strong sexual dimorphism, males being highly ornate with bright colours and adornments, such as wattles and long tails. Males are usually larger than females and have longer tails. Males play no part in rearing the young. They typically eat seeds and some insects.

Genera in taxonomic order
This list is ordered to show presumed relationships between species. Tribes and subfamily names are based on the 4th edition of the Howard and Moore Complete Checklist of the Birds of the World. Genera without a tribe are considered to belong to tribe incertae sedis.

"Erectile clade"

"Non-erectile clade"

References

 

 
Bird subfamilies